Killing at Hell's Gate is a 1981 American TV movie.

Cast
Robert Urich
Deborah Raffin
Lee Purcell

Reception
The New York Times said "Much of the film is devoted to Mr. Urich as he tries to bring the rafting party to safety. Periodically, there is romance. There is even some talk about the disappearing blue herons. But the driving force behind this adventure yarn is the scenery."

The Los Angeles Times called it a "routine adventure yarn" with a "good cast and suspenseful finale".

References

External links
Killing at Hell's Gate at BFI
Killing at Hell's Gate at Letterbox DVD
Killing at Hell's Gate at IMDb

1981 television films
American television films